Hype TV (commonly stylized as HYPE! TV) is an entertainment TV channel headquartered in Kingston, Jamaica.

The channel broadcasts performances of various upcoming and established musicians, as well as programmes about lifestyle, events, and popular culture in the Caribbean and worldwide.

References 

Television stations in Jamaica
Television channels and stations established in 1999